Norway was represented at the 1996 Summer Olympics in Atlanta, United States by the Norwegian Olympic Committee and Confederation of Sports.

Medalists

Gold
 Vebjørn Rodal — Athletics, Men's 800 m
 Knut Holmann — Canoeing, Men's K1 1,000 m Kayak Singles

Silver
 Knut Holmann — Canoeing, Men's K1 500 m Kayak Singles
 Steffen Størseth and Kjetil Undset — Rowing, Men's Double Sculls

Bronze
 Trine Hattestad — Athletics, Women's Javelin Throw
 Peer Moberg — Sailing, Men's Laser Individual Competition
 Reidun Seth, Tina Svensson, Trine Tangeraas, Marianne Pettersen, Hege Riise, Brit Sandaune, Merete Myklebust, Bente Nordby, Nina Nymark Andersen, Tone Gunn Frustol, Tone Haugen, Linda Medalen, Ann-Kristin Aarønes, Agnete Carlsen, and Gro Espeseth — Football (soccer), Women's Team Competition

Results by event

Archery
In the fifth appearance by the nation in the archery competition at the Olympics, Norway represented by one man and one woman.  Their combined record was 3–2.

Women's Individual Competition:
 Wenche-Lin Hess → Round of 32 - 17th place (1-1)

Men's Individual Competition:
 Bertil Martinus Grov → Round of 16, 14th place (2-1)

Athletics
Men's 200 metres
 Geir Moen
 Heat – 20.78 s (→ advanced to the quarter final)
 Quarter final – 20.48 s (→ advanced to the semi final)
 Semi final – 20.96 s (→ did not advance)

Men's 800 metres
 Atle Douglas
 Heat – 1:48.60 min (→ did not advance)
 Vebjørn Rodal
 Heat – 1:45.30 min (→ advanced to the semi final)
 Semi final – 1:43.96 min (→ advanced to the final)  
 Final – 1:42.58 min (→  Gold medal)

Men's 3000 metres steeplechase
 Jim Svenøy
 Heat – 8:31.30 min (→ advanced to the semi final)
 Semi final – 8:19.79 min (→ advanced to the final)  
 Final – 8:23.39 min (→ 8th place)  
 
Women's Marathon
 Anita Håkenstad — 2:43.58 hrs (→ 48th place)

Women's 100 metres hurdles
 Lena Solli
 Heat – 13.13 s (→ advanced to the quarter final)
 Quarter final – 13.30 s (→ did not advance)
  
Men's High Jump
 Steinar Hoen
 Qualification — 2.28 m (→ advanced to the final)
 Final — 2.32 m (→ 5th place)

Women's High Jump
 Hanne Haugland
 Qualification — 1.93 m (→ advanced to the final)
 Final — 1.96 m (→ 9th place)

Men's Triple Jump
 Sigurd Njerve
 Qualification — 16.15 m (→ did not advance)

Men's Discus Throw 
 Svein Inge Valvik
 Qualification — 59.60 m (→ did not advance)

Women's Discus Throw 
 Mette Bergmann
 Qualification — 62.24 m (→ advanced to the final)
 Final — 62.28 m (→ 9th place)

Men's Javelin Throw
 Pål Arne Fagernes
 Qualification — 79.78 m (→ did not advance)

Women's Javelin Throw
 Trine Hattestad
 Qualification — 64.52 m (→ advanced to the final)
 Final — 64.98 m (→  Bronze medal)

Boxing
Men's Light Middleweight (71 kg)
Jørn Johnson 
 First Round — Defeated Sean Black (Jamaica), 13-7 
 Second Round — Lost to Mohamed Marmouri (Tunisia), 4-17

Cycling

Road Competition
Women's Individual Road Race
Ragnhild Kostoll 
 Final — 02:37:06 (→ 18th place)

Ingunn Bollerud 
 Final — did not finish (→ no ranking)

Women's Individual Time Trial
May Britt Hartwell 
 Final — did not start (→ no ranking)

Mountain Bike
Men's Cross Country
 Rune Høydahl
 Final — 2:28:16 (→ 11th place)

Women's Cross Country
 Gunn-Rita Dahle
 Final — 1:53.50 (→ 4th place)

Football
Women's tournament

Swimming
Men's 100 m Breaststroke
Borge Mørk 
 Heat — 1:04.92 (→ did not advance, 31st place)

Men's 200 m Breaststroke
Borge Mørk 
 Heat — 2:20.42 (→ did not advance, 25th place)

Women's 50 m Freestyle
Vibeke Johansen 
 Heat — 26.22 (→ did not advance, 17th place)

Women's 100 m Freestyle
Vibeke Johansen 
 Heat — 56.88 (→ did not advance, 18th place)

Women's 400 m Freestyle
Irene Dalby 
 Heat — 4:19.34 (→ did not advance, 18th place)

Women's 800 m Freestyle
Irene Dalby 
 Heat — 8:37.73 
 Final — 8:38.34 (→ 5th place)

Women's 100 m Breaststroke
Elin Austevoll 
 Heat — 1:09.96 
 B-Final — 1:10.27 (→ 12th place)
Terrie Miller 
 Heat — 1:11.09 (→ did not advance, 20th place)

Women's 200 m Breaststroke
Elin Austevoll 
 Heat — 2:32.48 (→ did not advance, 19th place)

Women's 200 m Individual Medley
Elin Austevoll 
 Heat — 2:19.81 (→ did not advance, 24th place)

Volleyball

Men's Beach Competition
Jan Kvalheim and Björn Maaseide — 7th place overall

References
sports-reference

Nations at the 1996 Summer Olympics
1996 Summer Olympics
1996 in Norwegian sport